Puxico may refer to::
 Puxico, Missouri, in Stoddard County, Missouri
 Puxico (album), album by Natalie Hemby